Luling  is a city in Caldwell and Guadalupe counties, Texas, United States, along the San Marcos River. The population as of the 2020 census was 5,599.

History 
The town was named after a New York banker, Charles Luling. He was a personal friend of Thomas Wentworth Pierce and provided the financing for the railroad as well the purchase of the land that became Luling.

Luling was founded in 1874 as a railroad town and became a rowdy center for the cattle drivers on the Chisholm Trail. Contempt of the law by the cowboys helped Luling become known as the "toughest town in Texas". After the great cattle drives ended in the late 1880s, Luling quieted down to a town of about 500 and cotton ruled the local economy. Perhaps due to arrival of immigrants, including a sizeable Jewish population, in the late-19th century, Luling began a long, slow, period of growth, and by 1925 the population reached 1,500.

One of the most significant events in Luling's history was the discovery of oil by Edgar B. Davis. Davis mortgaged everything he owned to finance drilling operations around Luling. To repay his loans, Davis contracted  each to Atlantic Oil and Magnolia Oil at $.50 a barrel, plus another  to Magnolia at $.75 per barrel.

The economy quickly moved from the railroad and agriculture to oil. The population of the town rapidly increased to over 5,000.

As oil grew in importance in the 1930s and 1940s, the railroads that helped form the town declined and largely pulled out of Luling.

Geography
The city limits extend south along Texas State Highway 80 across the San Marcos River into Guadalupe County, reaching as far as Interstate 10 Exit 628.

Climate
The climate in this area is characterized by hot, humid summers and generally mild to cool winters.  According to the Köppen Climate Classification system, Luling has a humid subtropical climate, abbreviated "Cfa" on climate maps.

Demographics

As of the 2020 United States census, there were 5,599 people, 2,070 households, and 1,570 families residing in the city.

As of the 2010 census, there were 5,411 people, 1,907 households, and 1,315 families residing in Luling. The population density was 991.6 people per square mile (382.8/km). There were 2,115 housing units at an average density of 391.7/sq mi (150.0/km). The racial makeup of the city was 70.8% White, 8.5% African American, 0.4% Native American, 0.5% Asian, 16.7% some other race, and 3.1% from two or more races. Hispanics or Latinos of any race were 52.6% of the population.

There were 1,907 households, out of which 37.6% had children under the age of 18 living with them, 45.4% were headed by married couples living together, 17.4% had a female householder with no husband present, and 31.0% were non-families. 26.6% of all households were made up of individuals, and 14.2% were someone living alone who was 65 years of age or older. The average household size was 2.75, and the average family size was 3.36.

In the city, 27.3% of the population were under the age of 18, 6.3% were from 20 to 24, 24.6% from 25 to 44, 22.5% from 45 to 64, and 16.7% were 65 years of age or older. The median age was 35.5 years. For every 100 females, there were 87.9 males. For every 100 females age 18 and over, there were 85.1 males.

For the period 2011–2015, the estimated median annual income for a household in the city was $39,157, and the median income for a family was $46,379.  The per capita income for the city was $21,927. About 17.2% of families and 20.3% of the population were below the poverty line, including 30.3% of those under age 18 and 14.5% of those age 65 or over.

Culture
 

The Luling Watermelon Thump is held each year during the last full weekend in June. It is a big celebration for the locals and draws many people from out of town as well. A favorite activity associated with the 'Thump' is the watermelon seed spitting contest.

Luling is also home to Night in Old Luling, held in October. It features games, food, booths, and a scarecrow contest.

Also, on the weekend before Halloween each year, Lulingbach is held. 2021 marked the fifth anniversary of this festive weekend featuring a hog roast and shooting competitions.

Some of the oil jacks along the main streets of Luling are decorated with whimsical characters, such as a girl eating a watermelon.

The Luling Dry Tri. is an annual event held in September. It is an athletic contest comprising three consecutive events: biking 12 miles, running 3.23 miles and paddling 6 miles. A no swim triathlon (Dry Tri) where anyone may participate either solo, as a two-person tag-team or three-person relay team. The event benefits several local groups, including the Luling Police and Fire Departments, and the Luling High School Cross Country Team.

Education

Notable people

 Emory Bellard, college football coach
 Bo Burris, NFL player
 Jennie Everton Clarke, founder of the Belle Haven Orphan home
 Michael Dorn, actor
 Tamron Hall, journalist and television talk show host
 Obert Logan, NFL football player for the Dallas Cowboys and New Orleans Saints
 Craig Mager, NFL football player for the Denver Broncos
 Marshall W. Mason, Broadway director
 Riley Odoms, NFL football player for the Denver Broncos

References

External links

 
 City of Luling official website
 Luling Chamber of Commerce

Cities in Caldwell County, Texas
Cities in Guadalupe County, Texas
Cities in Texas
Cities in Greater Austin
Populated places established in 1874
1874 establishments in Texas